St Radegund  is a pub in King Street, Cambridge, England. It is named after St Radegund, a Frankish saint associated with the nearby Jesus College. It was closed under notice of forfeiture in August 2019  but is expected to reopen under a new landlord in December 2022.

Overview 
Was is the home to the Cantabrigensis Hash House Harriers, a successful rowing club, famous cricket team  and is the start/finish venue on the legendary King Street Run. All of these activities and more were encouraged (and in the case of the cricket team, started) by Terry Kavanagh (1937-2012), who was landlord between 1992 and 2009.

Since 1992 the St Radegund has played an annual cricket match against The Champion of the Thames, for the King Street Trophy.

In 2008, the saga of the 2003 St Radegund cricket tour to Croatia, The Ascent of Mount Hum, was published, to critical acclaim.

St Radegund is the smallest pub in Cambridge. Friday night is Vera Lynn Appreciation Society night when large gin and tonics are served to the sounds of the wartime Forces Sweetheart.

In 2007, it was pointed out that the pub sign depicted the arms of the Austrian municipality, Sankt Radegund bei Graz rather than the Saint herself. A local artist was commissioned to correct the mistake and the story attracted media comment. In 2010, the new landlord, James Hoskins, reverted to a design incorporating the former (incorrect) arms. In early 2015 the premises underwent a programme of refurbishment and redecoration after which it became a pub tied to the Saffron Brewery, ceasing to serve Habit and Sackcloth, beers specially brewed for the pub by Milton Brewery.

See also
St Radegund's Priory, Cambridge

References

Pubs in Cambridge